Samskruthy Shenoy  (born 20 November 1998) is an Indian actress who has acted in Malayalam, Telugu, Tamil and Kannada films.

Early life
Samskruthy Shenoy was educated at Saraswathi Vidyanikethan Public School in Kochi. She is trained in Bharatnatyam, Mohiniyattom and western dance. Her parents were initially against the idea of her becoming an actress, but later agreed as long as her studies were not affected.

In 2017, Samskruthy Shenoy became engaged to her long-term boyfriend Vishnu Nair.

Career
Samskruthy Shenoy started her career as a model of Lukmance Model Management agency. She went on to do modeling for the Kalyan Silks Ad Sale jingle and an ad-film for the PP Mall Mukkam before she landed the lead female role in the Telugu film, Hrudayam Ekkadunnadi directed by debutant director Vi Anand. Her maiden release, however, became the Malayalam film, My Fan Ramu in 2013 that featured her in a supporting role. She had also been chosen to play the lead role in the Tamil film Kutti Puli starring M. Sasikumar, but had to back out from the project due to exams and illness of her grandmother. She was chosen as the brand ambassador to launch the Amma Kitex Dezire youth bags in April 2013.

Her first release that had her in a starring role was Black Butterfly (2013) directed by Rajaputhra Ranjith. She played a Plus Two student named Aarathy in the film, who falls for her neighbour. Shenoy, who was 13 years old when she filmed for Black Butterfly, said that it wasn't easy to play a romantic character at her age and that she was "very uncomfortable initially". The film was released on 15 February 2013 and turned out to be a commercial failure, although her performance was received well by critics, with The Hindu's critic noting that she was "a surprise package". Hrudayam Ekkadunnadi in which she played Nithya, a "soft spoken service-oriented cool and calm character", released a month later.

2014 Shenoy was first seen in Vegam directed by adfilm maker Anil Kumar. She later made her Tamil film debut with Kaadu, a film based on the subject of deforestation that saw Shenoy playing a rural girl. Among her upcoming films are the Suseenthiran production Vil Ambu and the musical love story Kanaa in Tamil, Anarkali directed by Sachi  and Nikkah directed by newcomer Azad Alavil in Malayalam  and Happy Birthday in Kannada.

Filmography

References

External links
 

Living people
Actresses in Malayalam cinema
Indian film actresses
Actresses from Kochi
Actresses in Tamil cinema
Actresses in Kannada cinema
Actresses in Telugu cinema
21st-century Indian actresses
1998 births